L. C. Pedersen (Lauritz C. Pedersen) (May 10, 1862 – February 16, 1929) was an American businessman and politician.

Born in Denmark, he moved to Minnesota and settled in Askov, Minnesota. He was in farming, livestock, and the dairy business, creamery, banking, hardware, and merchandise business in Askov, Minnesota and Pine City, Minnesota. Pedersen served in the Minnesota House of Representatives in 1919–1922. He died in Askov, Minnesota.

Notes

1862 births
1929 deaths
People from Pine City, Minnesota
Businesspeople from Minnesota
Members of the Minnesota House of Representatives
Danish emigrants to the United States